A coup d'état occurred in Guatemala on 17 December 1930, which ousted president Baudilio Palma; then, Congress appointed coup leader Orellana Contreras as the new President of Guatemala in a legislative presidential election.

History 
After the coup d'état against president Baudilio Palma – who had just been designated president of Guatemala after a stroke forced president Lázaro Chacón to resign on 12 December 1930 – the Congress appointed general Manuel María Orellana Contreras as provisional president. However, given the large investments that American companies had in Guatemala -especially the United Fruit Company, the United States Secretary of State Henry Stimson publicly denounced Orellana as an unconstitutional leader and demanded his removal. Realizing that the Americans would not recognize his government, Orellana resigned on December 29.

Eventually, general Jorge Ubico came into power in 1931, and ruled Guatemala with a tight grip until he was deposed on 1 July 1944; during his rule, the power and influence of the United Fruit Company strengthened in Guatemala.

See also 
 Henry Stimson
 Jorge Ubico
 Lázaro Chacón
 Manuel María Orellana Contreras
 United Fruit Company

References

Bibliography 

 

1930 in Guatemala
United Fruit Company
1930 1
1930 elections in Central America